Justin "Hero" Cassell is a Montserratian calypsonian, popularly regarded as one of the pioneers of calypso from Montserrat.  He began performing in the 1950s.  His brother is the musician Arrow.

Cassell has won Montserrat's calypso crown more often than anyone else.  During the 1970s and 80s, he was part of a rivalry with the calypsonian musician Reality.

References

 
  

Montserratian musicians
Calypsonians
Year of birth missing (living people)
Living people